Baykal, or Lake Baikal, is a lake in southern Siberia, Russia.

Baykal or Baikal may also refer to:

Places
 Baykal, Belarus, a village in Vitsebsk Voblast
 Baykal, Bulgaria, a village in Dolna Mitropoliya Municipality of Pleven Province, Bulgaria
 Baykal, Russia, several rural localities in Russia
 Baykal, Çermik
 North Baikal Highlands, Buryatia, Russia
 Baikal Mountains, Irkutsk Oblast, Russia
 Pik Baikal, Buryatia, Russia

Science, technology and engineering
 Baikal (rocket booster), a booster for Angara rocket
 Baikal bullfinch, a small passerine bird
 UZGA LMS-901 Baikal, a small passenger aircraft
 Baykal-class motorship, a class of Russian river passenger ships
 SS Baikal, an ice-breaking train ferry which operated in Lake Baikal
 Shuttle 2.01, aka "Baikal", an unfinished Soviet space shuttle
 Baikal CPU, Russian-made processors based on the ARM Cortex-A57
 Baikal, a brand of Makarov pistol
 Baïkal, a CalDAV and CardDAV server

People with the given name
 Baykal Kulaksızoğlu (born 1983), Turkish Swiss footballer

People with the surname
 Aysel Baykal (1939–2003), Turkish female jurist, politician and former government minister
 Deniz Baykal (born 1938), former leader of the Turkish Republican People's Party

Other uses
 Baikal (drink), a Russian non-alcoholic drink
 Baikal Highway, a federal highway in Russia

See also
 Baikal black grayling, a species of fish
 Baikal bush warbler, a species of bird
 Baycol, a brand name of cerivastatin
 Baykalsky (disambiguation)